Statistics of League of Ireland in the 1973/1974 season.

Overview
It was contested by 14 teams, and Cork Celtic won the championship.

Final classification

Results

Top scorers

Ireland, 1973-74
1973–74 in Republic of Ireland association football
League of Ireland seasons